Veronika Simoniti (born 1967) is a Slovenian writer. She studied Italian and French Studies at university, which led her to work for several years as a freelance translator. She started writing scripts and stories at Radio Slovenia. Her first published story “Metuljev zaliv” (Butterfly Bay; 2000) won first prize in a Literatura magazine competition. Her debut collection of stories was titled Zasukane štorije (Twisted Stories; 2005). It was nominated as best debut of the year in 2006, and it also won Dnevnik newspaper's 2007 Fabula Award.

Simoniti's second collection Hudičev jezik (The Devil's Tongue; LUD Literatura) appeared in 2011, followed by the novel Kameno seme (Stony Seed; Založba Litera) in 2014. Kameno seme was nominated for the Kresnik Award for the best Slovenian novel of the year. Her work has appeared in several anthologies: Delo newspaper's “Summer Stories” collections for 2006 and 2012; the English-language collection of Slovenian short stories A Lazy Sunday Afternoon (Litteræ Slovenicæ, DSP, 2007) and another anthology of Slovenian authors Kliči me po imenu (Call Me by Name; Študentska založba, 2013). Her work has also been translated in numerous European languages.

Simoniti won the 2020 Kresnik Prize for her novel Ivana Before the Sea.

References

Slovenian writers
1967 births
Living people